Mrs. Winner's Chicken and Biscuits is a regional fast food restaurant in the U.S. Southeast which specializes in fried chicken. Mrs. Winner's is mostly known for their fried chicken and given away biscuits.

History

Mrs. Winner's was founded in 1979 by Jack C. Massey. Massey's operating company, Volunteer Capital, bought the Granny's of Atlanta chain of 21 restaurants from L.S. Hartzog and renamed them Mrs. Winner's Chicken & Biscuits. In 1982, Volunteer Capital was renamed Winners Corp. and by December there were 64 restaurants under the Mrs. Winner's umbrella.
In 1984 the chain boasted a total of 184 stores but by 1989 after four years of losses, the company decided to sell the franchise  to RTM Inc., Arby's largest franchisee, for about $30 million.

In 2006, Famous Recipe Company Operations, Inc., owner of the 
Lee's Famous Recipe franchise, acquired Mrs. Winners. As of August 2007, there were 113 locations in North Carolina, Tennessee, Georgia, Arkansas, Mississippi, and Kentucky. As of December 2021, there were 19 locations remaining, primarily in Alabama, North Carolina and Georgia, with one remaining location in Tennessee.

See also
 List of fast-food chicken restaurants
 List of fast food restaurants

References

Restaurants in Atlanta
Fast-food poultry restaurants
Restaurants established in 1979
American companies established in 1979
Chicken chains of the United States